Jacob Meek Lewis (October 13, 1823 – January 5, 1905) was a Massachusetts politician who served as the 15th Mayor of Lynn, Massachusetts, USA.

Notes

1823 births
Massachusetts city council members
Mayors of Lynn, Massachusetts
1905 deaths
19th-century American politicians